Almon is a masculine given name which is borne by:

 Almon Abbott (1881–1945), Canadian prelate of the Episcopal Church and Bishop of Lexington, Kentucky
 Almon W. Babbitt (1812–1856), an early leader in the Latter Day Saint movement, Mormon pioneer and first secretary and treasurer of the Territory of Utah
 Almon Glenn Braswell (1943–2006), American business owner and convicted felon pardoned by President Clinton
 Almon M. Clapp (1811–1899), American printer and politician, first Public Printer of the United States
 Almon Cornwell (1820–1893), American farmer, politician and Wisconsin pioneer
 A. R. Meek (1834–1888), American lawyer, politician and eighth Florida Attorney General
 Almon Heath Read (1790–1844), American politician
 Almon Rennie (1882–1949), Canadian businessman and politician
 Almon Brown Strowger (1839–1902), American inventor
 Almon Swan (c. 1819–1883), American politician
 Almon Harris Thompson (1839–1906), American topographer, geologist, explorer and educator
 Almon Woodworth (1841–1908), American politician

English-language masculine given names